The Republic of Sarah is an American drama television series that premiered on June 14, 2021, and concluded on September 6, 2021, on The CW. The series was created by Jeffrey Paul King and stars Stella Baker in the titular role, alongside Luke Mitchell, Megan Follows, Izabella Alvarez, Ian Duff, Hope Lauren, Nia Holloway, Landry Bender and Forrest Goodluck as a part of the main cast. In September 2021, the series was canceled after one season.

Premise
When a massive vein of coltan—an incredibly valuable mineral—is discovered under the town of Greylock, New Hampshire, a mining company prepares to extract the mineral which would effectively remove the town from existence.  Sarah Cooper, "a rebellious high school teacher" in Greylock, organizes and leads opposition.  However, an unexpected result occurs when  the town becomes its own nation, separate from the US. Thus Sarah and the rest of the town must grapple with developing their own country.

Cast

Main

 Stella Baker as Sarah Cooper, a history teacher in Greylock, New Hampshire who saves her town from Lydon Industries' plans to extract minerals there. She has feelings for Grover, and is yet to act on them.
 Luke Mitchell as Danny Cooper, Sarah's older brother who works for Lydon Industries as a lawyer
 Hope Lauren as Corinne Dearborn, Sarah's best friend and Danny's ex-fiancée, who has a son named Josh
 Nia Holloway as Amy 'AJ' Johnson, Sarah's friend who is loyal to her cause at all times and a Greylock police officer. She is secretly having an affair with the former mayor's wife Alexis.
 Ian Duff as Grover Sims, Sarah's other best friend who works at the local diner with a damaged past. He has feelings for Sarah, but is conflicted due to his wife's death two years prior.
 Forrest Goodluck as Tyler Easterbrook, a thoughtful and sweet student of Sarah's, who starts dating Bella in the pilot
 Landry Bender as Bella Whitmore, one of Sarah's students and the now-former mayor's daughter. Initially a rule-follower, she begins to step out of her shell and start helping Sarah fight for independence, much to her father's disapproval.
 Izabella Alvarez as Maya Jimenez, a girl struggling to adapt to life in a new town after being sent to live with her gay father and the youngest elected member of the Greylock Council
 Megan Follows as Ellen Cooper, Sarah and Danny's alcoholic and abusive mother, a former New Hampshire state senator

Recurring

 Noam Jenkins as William Whitmore, the former mayor of Greylock and Bella's father
 Nicola Correia-Damude as Alexis Whitmore, wife of the former mayor and Bella's stepmother. She is secretly having an affair with Amy 'AJ' Johnson.
 Salvatore Antonio as Luìs Vidal, Maya's father and the owner of the local diner
 Etienne Kellici as Josh Dearborne, Corinne's son
 Don W. Shepherd as Vince, a Greylock police officer
 Ryan Bruce as Adam Dearborn, Corrinne's husband 
 Daniel Di Tomasso as Weston, a reporter who arrives in Greylock, New Hamphsire to chronicle the life and times of the new nation
 Paloma Nuñez as Liz Fernsby, an elected member of the Greylock Council
 Xander Berkeley as Paul Cooper, Sarah and Danny's estranged father

Episodes

Production

Development
The show was originally under development by CBS, with a pilot ordered, but the network passed on the show. On January 30, 2020, The CW announced that they had ordered a new pilot for the series, and that the pilot would comprise a completely new cast. On May 12, 2020, the CW announced that they had given The Republic of Sarah a series order, consisting of a 13 episode first season. On September 2, 2021, The CW canceled the series after one season.

Casting
In February 2020, it was reported that Stella Baker would star in the series's title role. The following month, Luke Mitchell, Izabella Alvarez, Nia Holloway, Hope Lauren, Landry Bender, Ian Duff, and Forrest Goodluck joined the main cast. On January 15, 2021, Xander Berkeley was cast in a recurring role. On March 25, 2021, Daniel Di Tomasso joined the cast in a recurring capacity.

Filming
Principal photography for the series' pilot was originally scheduled to take place in spring-2020, but was postponed due to the COVID-19 pandemic.

Broadcast
The Republic of Sarah premiered on June 14, 2021, and the series finale aired on September 6, 2021, on The CW. In Canada, the series airs on Citytv. In India, the series streams on CBS Studios's sister streamer Voot. In South Africa the series is broadcast on DStv channel 101 M-Net.

Reception

Critical response
On Rotten Tomatoes, the series holds an approval rating of 43% based on 7 critic reviews, with an average rating of 6/10. On Metacritic, it has a weighted average score of 48 out of 100, based on 4 critics, indicating "mixed or average reviews".

Ratings

References

External links
 

2020s American drama television series
2021 American television series debuts
2021 American television series endings
The CW original programming
English-language television shows
Television series about families
Television series by Warner Bros. Television Studios
Television series by CBS Studios
Television series set in the 2020s
Television shows set in New Hampshire
Television productions postponed due to the COVID-19 pandemic